Eric III Lamb ( – 27 August 1146) was the King of Denmark from 1137 until 1146. He was the grandson of Eric I of Denmark and the nephew of Eric II of Denmark, whom he succeeded on the throne. He abdicated in 1146, as the first and only Danish monarch to do so voluntarily. His succession led to a period of civil war between Sweyn III, Canute V, and Valdemar I.

Biography
Eric was born on Funen. His mother was Ragnhild, the daughter of King Eric I, and his father the nobleman Hakon Sunnivasson, a great-grandson of King Magnus the Good of Norway and Denmark. Eric was the nephew of Eric II of Denmark, fighting for him at the decisive Battle of Fotevik in 1134, and succeeded Eric II to the throne when he was murdered in 1137. Not much is known of Eric's kingship. Contemporary chroniclers highly disagree about the personality of this king, and he portrayed both as a passive and irresolute man, as well as an eager and brave fighter. 

Eric had to fight for his kingship against his cousin Olaf Haraldsen, sometimes called Olaf II. Olaf established a base of power in Scania in 1139 and tried to conquer the throne from there, until Eric defeated and killed him in 1141 near Helsingborg. During the civil wars, the Wends raided the Danish coasts and sounds without much Danish resistance. Eric supported Magnus the Blind and Sigurd Slembe in the Norwegian civil war. He worked to aggrandize the church, especially St. Canute's Abbey in Odense, and had a close relationship with bishop Eskil of Roskilde.

In 1143, he married Lutgard of Salzwedel, daughter of Rudolf I, Margrave of the Nordmark. Eric and Lutgard were married by Rudolf's son Hartwig, then Provost of Bremen Cathedral, in 1143 or 1144.

In 1146, Eric abdicated, as the only Danish king in history, for unknown reasons. He entered St. Canute's Abbey, where he died on 27 August 1146 and was buried at the cloister. His abdication has been explained as being rooted either in his realization of his inability to govern, or an illness which ultimately killed him.

Legacy
His nickname "Lam" means "lamb". This is taken to either reference the Lamb of God as he was seen as a pious man, as describing his mildhearted and generous nature, or indicating a weak and soft king. He married Lutgard of Salzwedel in 1144, which indicated an increasing German influence on Denmark. He and Lutgard did not have any children, though Eric fathered a son, Magnus, out of wedlock. After Eric died, Lutgard married Herman II of Winzenburg.

References 

House of Estridsen
1120s births
1146 deaths
Year of birth uncertain
Burials at St. Canute's Cathedral
Monarchs who abdicated
12th-century kings of Denmark